Battle of Vilnius (Vilna, Wilno) may refer to:

 Battle of Vilnius (1655), Russia captures the city during the Russo-Polish War (1654–1667)
 Battle of Vilnius (1660), Grand Duchy of Lithuania recaptures the city from Russia
 Battle of Vilnius (1702), Grand Duchy of Lithuania unsuccessfully attempts to capture the city from Sweden during the Great Northern War
 Battle of Wilno (1812), France captures the city during the French invasion of Russia
 First Battle of Wilno (1831), Polish uprising of 1831
 Second Battle of Wilno (1831), Polish uprising of 1831
 Battle of Vilna (1915), Germany captures the city during World War I
 Vilna offensive (1919), Poland captures the city during the Polish–Soviet War
 First Battle of Wilno (1920), Soviet Union captures the city during the Polish–Soviet War
 Second Battle of Wilno (1920), Poland recaptures the city during the Polish–Soviet War
 Battle of Wilno (1939), Soviet Union captures the city during the Invasion of Poland
 Battle of Wilno (1941), Nazi Germany captures the city during the Operation Barbarossa
 Operation Ostra Brama (1944), Armia Krajowa captures the city during the Operation Tempest
 Battle of Vilnius (1944), Soviet Union captures the city during the Baltic Offensive